The Sheridan Railroad Historic District, in Sheridan, Wyoming, is a  historic district which was listed on the National Register of Historic Places in 2004.

The district includes railroad-related resources and a well-preserved working-class neighborhood.

The district includes 110 contributing buildings and two contributing structures in an area including 201-841 Broadway and 508-955 N. Gould.

A master plan was created for development of the district.

References

Historic districts on the National Register of Historic Places in Wyoming
National Register of Historic Places in Sheridan County, Wyoming